The Capriccio with Palladian buildings is an oil painting on canvas (58x82 cm) by Canaletto, dating from about 1756 to 1759 and stored in the Galleria Nazionale Di Parma.

Picture content and symbolism 
The painting shows a fictitious scene with buildings by the Italian architect Andrea Palladio. The Palazzo Chiericati in Vicenza can be seen at the left edge of the picture, the building on the right is the Basilica Palladiana in Vicenza. The bridge is Palladios project for the Rialto Bridge in Venice, which, however, was not executed.

References

Sources
  
 

Collections of the Galleria nazionale di Parma
1750s paintings